The Colonial Cottage Museum is a heritage-listed former cottage and now museum at Bow Street, Merriwa, Upper Hunter Shire, New South Wales, Australia. It is also known as Merriwa Cottage and Cottage Museum. The property is owned by the Upper Hunter Shire Council and was added to the New South Wales State Heritage Register on 2 April 1999.

History
The cottage was built between 1847 and 1856 as a private residence. The cottage was made from local sandstone quarried that was pushed down on timber slabs. The cottage served as a series of banking businesses until the 1950s when it became a private residence. The original building consisted of four rooms, a cellar area and a separate kitchen at the rear of the building, since removed.

Heritage listing 
The Colonial Cottage Museum was listed on the New South Wales State Heritage Register on 2 April 1999.

See also 

List of museums in New South Wales

References

Bibliography

Attribution

External links

New South Wales State Heritage Register
Upper Hunter Shire
Historic house museums in New South Wales
Articles incorporating text from the New South Wales State Heritage Register